Eric Appel (born August 13, 1980) is an American filmmaker working in television, film, and commercials.

Originally from Endicott, New York, Appel attended the Art Institute of Pittsburgh, majoring in computer animation. Describing his childhood interests, Appel said, "I was always playing around with video cameras, but I was also the kid that drew cartoons. It’s weird. I was so obsessed with movies and television, but nobody ever told me that I should go to film school... [W]hen I decided to go to school for animation, it felt like a no-brainer. However, when I actually went away to college, I realized that I had made a mistake (and also that I wasn’t that great at drawing). I actually spent more time working on videos with my roommate, who was majoring in video production, than I did working on my own projects."

While in college, Appel also began performing improv comedy, after his girlfriend brought him to a "show at the University of Pittsburgh called 'Friday Nite Improvs ,' where anyone from the audience could volunteer to go up on stage and perform these improv games." After moving to New York City, Appel started taking classes at the Upright Citizens Brigade Theater, "and it wasn’t long before I was basically living at the theatre. I became very involved very quickly. [I was] taking improv classes, interning, running the lights for shows and really helping out in any way that I could so I could just be around comedy as much as possible."

While still in New York, Appel got a job writing for The Andy Milonakis Show, then moved to Los Angeles for that show's third season when its production was relocated to California. He subsequently wrote for Crank Yankers and Human Giant, then went to work for the comedy website Funny or Die. "Funny or Die was such a young company when they hired me...there were about eight of us all sitting around a large dining room table on laptops. Every day a few people would disappear to go shoot some shit and then the next day they would be sitting next to you editing it. Then it would go up on the site and it would either get a million hits or nobody would watch it and it would disappear and then it was on to the next thing. Everyone there worked at their own pace and you were encouraged to just go pick up a camera and make something...I used this as an opportunity to start directing my own sketches and quickly found out that not only do I like directing more than writing, but also that I’m better at it."

Appel would go on to extensively direct series television, with credits including Eagleheart, NTSF:SD:SUV, The Office, New Girl, Brooklyn Nine-Nine, Son of Zorn, and Die Hart.

In 2022, Appel made his feature directorial debut with Weird: The Al Yankovic Story, based on a Funny or Die short that he directed twelve years earlier. The film won a Critics Choice Award for Best Made for Television Movie.

References

External links

1980 births
21st-century American comedians
21st-century American screenwriters
21st-century American male writers
American male comedians
American film editors
American television directors
American television writers
American male television writers
Comedians from New York (state)
Comedy film directors
Film directors from New York (state)
Film producers from New York (state)
Living people
People from Endicott, New York
Screenwriters from New York (state)
Upright Citizens Brigade Theater performers